The 2004 Red Bull Air Race World Series was the second Red Bull Air Race World Series season. It debuted on June 20, 2004 and ended on September 18.

In the 2004 season, the number of Air Race venues increased from two to three locations. The leg in Zeltweg Austria was removed and RAF Kemble (now called Cotswold Airport) in the United Kingdom became the season opener. Reno, Nevada in the United States was also added to the calendar. And the race in Budapest moved away from Tokol Airport, to the Danube, creating the first race over water.

In addition to the previous year's competitors, three pilots from the USA, Mike Mangold, Michael Goulian and David Martin, a Dutch pilot Frank Versteegh and Nicolas Ivanoff of France took part at the Air Races in 2004. American Kirby Chambliss,  became champion in 2004 with a total of 17 points winning two of the three races, followed by Hungarian Péter Besenyei (12 points), who won both races in 2003. British pilot Steve Jones and German aviator  Klaus Schrodt shared the 3rd place with eight points.

Race calendar

Standings and results

Legend:
 DNP: Did not participate
 DNS: Did not show

Aircraft

External links
 Details of 2004 Air Races

Red Bull Air Race World Championship seasons
Red Bull Air Race World Series
Red Bull Air Race World Series